Meriga Salou Seriki (born 8 April 1953) is a Beninese boxer. He competed in the men's light flyweight event at the 1972 Summer Olympics.

References

1953 births
Living people
Beninese male boxers
Olympic boxers of Benin
Boxers at the 1972 Summer Olympics
Place of birth missing (living people)
Light-flyweight boxers